Sale may refer to:

Common meanings
 Sales, the exchange of goods for profits
 Sales, discounts and allowances in the prices of goods

Places
Sale, Victoria, a city in Australia
Sale, Myanmar, a city
Sale, Greater Manchester, a town in England
Sale (Thrace), an ancient Greek city
Sale, Piedmont, a commune in Italy
Salé, a city in Morocco
Republic of Salé, a 17th-century corsair city-state on the Moroccan coast
Şäle, also transliterated Shali, Republic of Tatarstan, a village in Russia
Sale (Tanzanian ward)
Sale Island, Canada

People
Sale (Berkshire cricketer), an 18th-century English cricketer
Sale Ngahkwe (c. 875–934), a king of the Pagan dynasty of Burma
Sale (surname)

Other uses
 Sale, a grocery store chain in Finland
The Sale, an album by the American progressive rock band Crack the Sky
BOC Aviation, formerly Singapore Aircraft Leasing Enterprise (SALE)
Sale Sharks, rugby union club, often referred to simply as Sale

See also
Sales (disambiguation)
Sail (disambiguation)